Viktorija Golubic was the defending champion, but chose not to participate.

Beatriz Haddad Maia won the title, defeating Anna Blinkova in the final, 7–6(7–3), 6–3.

Seeds

Draw

Finals

Top half

Bottom half

Qualifying

Seeds

Qualifiers

Draw

First qualifier

Second qualifier

Third qualifier

Fourth qualifier

References

External links
Main draw
Qualifying draw

2022 WTA 125 tournaments
2022 L'Open 35 de Saint-Malo - 1